Oliver Sigurjónsson (born 3 March 1995) is an Icelandic football midfielder, who is currently plays for Breiðablik .

Club career

Oliver started his career with local club Breiðablik before signing with AGF in Denmark when he was 16 years old. In 2014, he moved back to Breiðablik to start his senior career. On 25 July 2017 Sigurjónsson signed a three years contract for Norwegian side Bodø/Glimt.

Career statistics

Club

International career
Oliver made his first senior international appearance on 17 November 2015 in a match against Slovakia, when he came on as a substitute for Jóhann Berg Guðmundsson with ten minutes left of the match.

References

External links

1995 births
Living people
Oliver Sigurjonsson
Oliver Sigurjonsson
Oliver Sigurjonsson
Oliver Sigurjonsson
Oliver Sigurjonsson
Oliver Sigurjonsson
Association football midfielders
FK Bodø/Glimt players
Norwegian First Division players
Eliteserien players
Oliver Sigurjonsson
Expatriate men's footballers in Denmark
Oliver Sigurjonsson
Expatriate footballers in Norway
Oliver Sigurjonsson